Phellinstatin is an enoyl-ACP reductase inhibitor isolated from the fungus Phellinus linteus.

References 

Hispidins
Phellinus